João W. Nery (12 February 1950 – 26 October 2018), was a Brazilian writer, psychologist, and LGBT activist. He is known to be the first transgender man to have undergone sex-change surgery in Brazil; it took place in 1977.

Career 

João became an LGBT rights activist, especially of the trans population. A bill by congressman Jean Wyllys and congresswoman Erika Kokay bears his name. Based on the Argentine Identity and Gender Law, the project guarantees the right to recognize the gender identity of all transgender people in Brazil, without the need for judicial authorization, medical or psychological reports, surgery or hormone treatment.

In August 2017, Nery was discovered to have a lung cancer. Smoking since he was 15 years old, he underwent chemotherapy. In September 2018, Nery revealed on social networks that cancer had hit the brain; he died in Niteroi, on 26 October 2018, aged 68.

Body of work

Literature
 Erro de pessoa: Joana ou João?, Rio de Janeiro, Editora Record, 1984.
 Viagem solitária: memórias de um transexual 30 anos depois, São Paulo, Leya Brasil, 2012.
 Vidas trans: a coragem de existir (in co-opeartion with Amara Moira, Márcia Rocha e T. Brant), Bauru, Leya Brasil, 2017.
 Velhice transviada, Postumo, 2018.

Bibliography 
 Jesus, Dánie Marcelo de; Carbonieri, Divanize; Nigro, Claudia M.C. (2017). Estudos sobre gênero: identidades, discurso e educação – homenagem a João W. Nery. [S.l.]: Pontes. 252 pp. .
 Gonçalves Jr., Sara W. P. (2017) Invisíveis. In:Estudos sobre gênero: identidades, discurso e educação – homenagem a João W. Nery. Editora Pontes. 2017 .

References 

1950 births
2018 deaths
Brazilian LGBT rights activists
Brazilian LGBT novelists
Brazilian LGBT journalists
20th-century Brazilian novelists
20th-century Brazilian male writers
Brazilian male novelists
Brazilian male journalists
Transgender men
Transgender novelists
Transgender journalists
21st-century Brazilian male writers
Brazilian non-fiction writers
Male non-fiction writers
Brazilian transgender people
20th-century Brazilian LGBT people
21st-century Brazilian LGBT people